Yesvantpur–Shivamogga Town Express is  an Express train belonging to South Western Railway zone of Indian Railways that run between  and Shivamogga Town in India.

Background
This train was inaugurated on 16 January 2017, Flagged off by Suresh Prabhu Former Minister of Railways for more connectivity between Bangalore and Shimoga.

Service
The frequency of this train is three days a week, it covers the distance of 268 km with an average speed of 45 km/hr.

Routes
This train passes through  ,  &  for by passing both sides.

Traction
As this route is currently going to be electrified, a WDP-4 based loco pulls the train to its destination on both sides.

External links
 16581 Yesvantpur Shivamogga Town Express
 16582 Shivamogga Town Yesvantpur Express

References

Express trains in India
Rail transport in Karnataka
Transport in Bangalore